Dobo is a small village located in Sami District, Central River Division in The Gambia, a country in West Africa. The village borders the Dobo Forest Park.

Other Information 
Dobo has a permanent population of around 535 Inhabitants. It is situated 39 metres above sea level. The town has a Muslim Mosque.

References 

Populated places in the Gambia